Pascale Paradis defeated Patricia Hy in the final, 6–2, 6–1 to win the girls' singles tennis title at the 1983 Wimbledon Championships.

Seeds

  Michelle Torres (third round)
  Patty Fendick (quarterfinals)
  Beverly Bowes (quarterfinals)
  Sabrina Goleš (second round)
  Patricia Hy (final)
  Nathalie Herreman (semifinals)
  Amanda Brown (third round)
  Elizabeth Minter (first round)

Draw

Finals

Top half

Section 1

Section 2

Bottom half

Section 3

Section 4

References

External links

Girls' Singles
Wimbledon Championship by year – Girls' singles